Angga Pratama (born 12 May 1991) is an Indonesian badminton player affiliated with Jaya Raya Jakarta club. He competed in the men's doubles event in the international tournaments, and together with Ricky Karanda Suwardi, he won the 2015 Singapore Open, became his one and only BWF World Superseries title after beating Chinese pair Fu Haifeng and Zhang Nan by 21–15, 11–21, 21–14.

Achievements

Southeast Asian Games 
Men's doubles

BWF World Junior Championships 
Boys' doubles

Mixed doubles

Asian Junior Championships 
Boys' doubles

BWF World Tour (1 runner-up) 
The BWF World Tour, which was announced on 19 March 2017 and implemented in 2018, is a series of elite badminton tournaments sanctioned by the Badminton World Federation (BWF). The BWF World Tour is divided into levels of World Tour Finals, Super 1000, Super 750, Super 500, Super 300, and the BWF Tour Super 100.

Men's doubles

BWF Superseries (1 title, 4 runners-up) 
The BWF Superseries, which was launched on 14 December 2006 and implemented in 2007, was a series of elite badminton tournaments, sanctioned by the Badminton World Federation (BWF). BWF Superseries levels were Superseries and Superseries Premier. A season of Superseries consisted of twelve tournaments around the world that had been introduced since 2011. Successful players were invited to the Superseries Finals, which were held at the end of each year.

Men's doubles

  BWF Superseries Finals tournament
  BWF Superseries Premier tournament
  BWF Superseries tournament

BWF Grand Prix (4 titles, 4 runners-up) 
The BWF Grand Prix had two levels, the Grand Prix and Grand Prix Gold. It was a series of badminton tournaments sanctioned by the Badminton World Federation (BWF) and played between 2007 and 2017.

Men's doubles

  BWF Grand Prix Gold tournament
  BWF Grand Prix tournament

BWF International Challenge/Series (2 runners-up) 
Men's doubles

  BWF International Challenge tournament
  BWF International Series tournament

Performance timeline

National team 
 Senior level

Individual competitions

Junior level  
 Boys' doubles

 Mixed ' doubles

Senior level

Men's doubles

Mixed doubles

Record against selected opponents 
Men's doubles results against World Superseries finalists, World Superseries Finals semifinalists, World Championships semifinalists, and Olympic quarterfinalists paired with:

Ricky Karanda Suwardi 

  Cai Yun & Lu Kai 1–1
  Chai Biao & Hong Wei 0–1
  Fu Haifeng & Zhang Nan 1–1
  Li Junhui & Liu Yuchen 1–2
  Liu Xiaolong & Qiu Zihan 1–2
  Lee Sheng-mu & Tsai Chia-hsin 1–0
  Mads Pieler Kolding & Mads Conrad-Petersen 1–1
  Mathias Boe & Carsten Mogensen 0–5
  Marcus Fernaldi Gideon & Kevin Sanjaya Sukamuljo 1–4
  Kenichi Hayakawa & Hiroyuki Endo 2–2
  Takeshi Kamura & Keigo Sonoda 5–1
  Kim Gi-jung & Kim Sa-rang 3–1
  Ko Sung-hyun & Shin Baek-cheol 1–1
  Lee Yong-dae & Yoo Yeon-seong 1–5
  Goh V Shem & Tan Wee Kiong 2–0
  Koo Kien Keat & Tan Boon Heong 0–1

Rian Agung Saputro 

  Cai Yun & Fu Haifeng 2–1
  Chai Biao & Guo Zhendong 1–2
  Chai Biao & Hong Wei 1–0
  Hong Wei & Shen Ye 0–2
  Liu Xiaolong & Qiu Zihan 3–1
  Lee Sheng-mu & Tsai Chia-hsin 0–2
  Jonas Rasmussen & Mads Conrad-Petersen 0–1
  Mads Pieler Kolding & Mads Conrad-Petersen 2–1
  Mathias Boe & Carsten Mogensen 0–3
  Bona Septano & Muhammad Ahsan 1–2
  Hendra Aprida Gunawan & Alvent Yulianto Chandra 1–1
  Markis Kido & Hendra Setiawan 0–2
  Muhammad Ahsan & Hendra Setiawan 1–1
  Hirokatsu Hashimoto & Noriyasu Hirata 1–4
  Hiroyuki Endo & Kenichi Hayakawa 2–4
  Takeshi Kamura & Keigo Sonoda 0–1
  Cho Gun-woo & Kwon Yi-goo 0–2
  Jung Jae-sung & Lee Yong-dae 1–1
  Kim Gi-jung & Kim Sa-rang 0–4
  Ko Sung-hyun & Lee Yong-dae 0–1
  Ko Sung-hyun & Shin Baek-cheol 0–1
  Lee Yong-dae & Yoo Yeon-seong 1–2
  Mohd Zakry Abdul Latif & Mohd Fairuzizuan Mohd Tazari 1–1
  Koo Kien Keat & Tan Boon Heong 1–1
  Hoon Thien How & Tan Wee Kiong 1–0
  Bodin Isara & Maneepong Jongjit 0–2

References

External links
 

1991 births
Living people
Sportspeople from Jakarta
Indonesian male badminton players
Badminton players at the 2014 Asian Games
Asian Games competitors for Indonesia
Competitors at the 2013 Southeast Asian Games
Competitors at the 2015 Southeast Asian Games
Southeast Asian Games gold medalists for Indonesia
Southeast Asian Games medalists in badminton
Universiade gold medalists for Indonesia
Universiade medalists in badminton
Medalists at the 2011 Summer Universiade